The European road E401 or E401 is a road that only runs through France.

The road starts near Saint-Brieuc and ends in Caen. Between Saint-Brieuc and Tramain are the E401 and the E50 on the same track. Between Pontaubault and Villedieu-les-Poêles are the E401 and the E3 on the same track.

National roadnumbers 
The E401 runs over on the following national roadnumbers:

External links 
 UN Economic Commission for Europe: Overall Map of E-road Network (2007)

401
E401